Boris, Borys or Barys (Bulgarian, Russian, Serbian,) is a male name of Bulgar origin, an extinct Oghur Turkic language. It is most commonly used in Russia, Belarus, Ukraine, Bulgaria, Serbia, Bosnia and Herzegovina, Croatia, North Macedonia, Montenegro, Slovakia, Slovenia and other countries in Eastern Europe. The spelling variant Borys is more common in Poland.

Meaning
A commonly accepted theory is that it is a Bulgar language name. Its precise etymology is unclear. It may be derived from one or more of several Turkic words such as böri – meaning "wolf", or from bogöri – which means "short", or from bars – meaning "snow leopard".  It can be used as a short form of the name Borislav, derived from the Slavic elements borti "battle" and slava "glory", "fame". Through the nickname "Bob" the name is often linked together with the name Robert, an ancient Germanic name meaning "fame-bright".

Origin
Boris is first found in written records in the case of the Bulgarian ruler Knyaz Boris I (852–889), who adopted Christianity in AD 864 and introduced it to his people. His name came to be known in Europe in relation to this particular act. Moreover, after his death in AD 907 he was proclaimed the first Bulgarian saint, and traces of his Orthodox sainthood during this period can be found as far away as Catholic Ireland. The Patriarchate of Constantinople recognized the canonization of St. Boris in AD 923. Prince Boris was purportedly not a Slav and descended from the Bulgars. Among the Bulgars the name was known in its two forms: Boris and Bogoris.

History
Boris started its worldwide spread with its adoption by Rus' Slavs from the First Bulgarian Empire. Bulgarian cultural missions intensified in the 10th century, during the reign of Tsar Petar and with them the spread of Bulgarian culture to what would become Ukrainian and Russian lands continued. It is speculated that the name of the Bulgarian saint Tsar Boris I reached the Rus in the late 10th century, likely during the reign of Boris II of Bulgaria (969–977), great-grandson of Boris I. In 967 the Byzantines instigated the Rus to attack the First Bulgarian Empire and it is probably around this campaign that the marriage of Vladimir I of Kiev to a Bulgarian noblewoman, who is assumed to be a daughter of Peter I, i.e., sister of Boris II, was arranged.

One of the sons of Vladimir I was given the name Boris. As evidenced by the Rus' Primary Chronicle, Boris and Gleb were sons of Vladimir I, born to him by the Bulgarian princess. During Vladimir's reign in 988 the conversion of the Kievan Rus' to Christianity took place. In this conversion, both ordinary priests and prelates from Bulgaria played a significant part. Also, with the adoption of the Byzantine calendar and the Eastern Orthodox liturgical calendar, the cult of St. Boris entered the Rus' Orthodox Church. In 1015, the princes Boris and Gleb were killed by their stepbrother Sviatopolk I of Kiev, who usurped the throne. Within a short time, Boris and Gleb were canonized and ever since, they have been the native soldier-saints most revered among the Ukrainians, Russians and Belarusians.

Spreading
In addition to Kievan Rus the name Boris went over to other neighbours of Bulgaria as well. An example of this is the case of the Hungarian prince Boris Kalamanos (1112–1155), son of the Magyar king from his marriage with Euphtimia, daughter of the Kievan prince Vladimir II Monomakh. For a fairly long period men named Boris were found predominantly in the courts and among the nobility, but eventually the name became popular among all strata in the Russian Empire, including Siberia and Russian Alaska. Eventually the name spread internationally beginning in the mid-to-late 20th century.

List of people with given name Boris

Fictional characters 

 Boris Badenov, the main antagonist in the 1960s animated cartoons The Rocky and Bullwinkle Show
 Boris Bushkin, a character in the cartoon M.A.S.K. (TV series)
 Boris Drubetskoy, an army officer in Leo Tolstoy's epic novel War And Peace
 Boris Grishenko, Russian hacker working for terrorists in the James Bond movie GoldenEye
 Boris Grushenko, the main character in the film Love and Death, played by Woody Allen
 Boris Kropotkin, Jewish character in the television show Rugrats
 Boris Pavlikovsky, character in Donna Tartt's 2013 novel The Goldfinch
 Boris the Animal, main antagonist character in the science fiction film Men in Black 3
 Boris "the Blade" Yurinov, an arms dealer in the film Snatch
 "Boris the Spider", 1966 song by The Who
 Boris the wolf, a character from the episodic puzzle horror video game Bendy and the Ink Machine
 Boris, a redfish in the eponymous Italian TV series
 Boris, mightiest of the Warriors of Loathing in the Times of Old, from the internet game Kingdom of Loathing
 "Boris", song from The Melvins' 1991 album Bullhead that gave its name to the Japanese metal band
 Boris, the Borzoi in the Lady and the Tramp cartoon
 Boris, the father on the PBS Kids show Caillou
 Boris, the Russian goose in the Balto movies
 Boris, the Soviet army unit in strategy game Command & Conquer: Yuri's Revenge
 Boris, the villain from the Adventures of Tintin series' 1956 book The Calculus Affair
 Boris Tepes Dracula from the Shaman King series

See also 
 Ruslan (given name)

References

Slavic masculine given names
Turkic masculine given names
Bulgarian masculine given names
Belarusian masculine given names
Bosnian masculine given names
Croatian masculine given names
Czech masculine given names
Macedonian masculine given names
Montenegrin masculine given names
Slovak masculine given names
Slovene masculine given names
Polish masculine given names
Russian masculine given names
Serbian masculine given names
Ukrainian masculine given names